Jan Szymański (born 17 April 1960 in Sieradz, died there 12 August 2005) was a Polish wrestler who competed in the 1980 Summer Olympics.

References

1960 births
2005 deaths
Olympic wrestlers of Poland
Wrestlers at the 1980 Summer Olympics
Polish male sport wrestlers
People from Sieradz
Sportspeople from Łódź Voivodeship